Nelug Dzö is a poetic vignette written in Classical Tibetan and one of the Seven Treasuries of Longchenpa. Longchenpa wrote Desum Nyingpo (Wylie: sde gsum snying po), a prose autocommentary to this work. Keith Dowman considers it a "magical psychotropic poem".

Etymology
Sanskrit title in IAST: Tathātva-ratna-koṣa-nāma.

Importantly, the Tibetan Wylie "gnas lugs" is the analogue of the Sanskrit IAST "Tathātva". The online dictionary of the Tibetan and Himalayan Library identifies "Tathātva" (which is a Sanskrit contraction or compound of "Tathātā" and "Tattva") as synonymous with Tathātā and Dharmatā.

Outline of text
Rigpa Shedra  provides an English text outline following the translation by Barron, from whom the Tibetan was sourced, as follows:
The Theme of 'Ineffability'
The Theme of 'Openness'
The Theme of 'Spontaneous Presence'
The Theme of 'Oneness'
The Individuals to Whom These Teachings May Be Entrusted

Intertextuality and themes

The majority of quotations cited by Longchenpa in the Desum Nyingpo are drawn from the tantras of  the Nyingma Gyubum ('Collected Tantras of the Ancients'). Out of the Nyingma Gyubum the most quoted tantra in the Desum Nyingpo is the Kunjed Gyalpo, the principal tantra of Semde, the 'mind series'  of Dzogchen. Sixteen of the  Seventeen Tantras of the Upadesha-varga are quoted at least once in the Desum Nyingpo and the most cited is the principal tantra of this class, the Drataljur or Reverberation of Sound.

English translations
In 1998, Richard Barron  opened the discourse into English with his translation of the Nelug Dzö in free verse with the Tibetan verse on the facing page for probity along with its prose autocommentary by Longchenpa, the Desum Nyingpo, with both works within the one bound volume. The numerous embedded quotations from the Seventeen Tantras were referenced and checked by Barron against the collection enshrined in the edition printed at Adzom Chögar in eastern Tibet. Keith Dowman has also tendered an English rendering.

References

Citations

Works cited

Further reading
 (Digitization of the pecha of the Tibetan root text).

Nyingma texts